Nuclear receptor coactivator 5 (NCOA5), also known as coactivator independent of AF-2 function (CIA), is a protein that in humans is encoded by the NCOA5 gene.

Function 

This gene encodes a coregulator for the alpha and beta estrogen receptors and the orphan nuclear receptor Rev-ErbA beta. The protein localizes to the nucleus, and is thought to have both coactivator and corepressor functions. Its interaction with nuclear receptors is independent of the AF2 domain on the receptors, which is known to regulate interaction with other coreceptors. Two alternatively spliced transcript variants for this gene have been described. However, the full length nature of one of the variants has not been determined.

References

Further reading

External links 
 
 

Transcription coregulators
Human proteins